The Mississippi Library Commission (MLC) Is the official library agency of Mississippi located in Jackson, Mississippi. It was established in 1926 by an Act of the Mississippi Legislature. It is overseen by a five-member Board of Commissioners.

The MLC maintains statewide databases of online resources, offers statewide networked access to MS public library catalogs, manages the Talking Book Services for print-disabled readers and hosts the WPA County Files from Works Progress Administration programs in the 1930s. MLC publishes two quarterly newsletters, On the Same Page and The Reading Light.

Building
The MLC's headquarters is a 60,000 square foot building built in 2005 that is open to the public. It was awarded the American Architecture Award in 2007.

References

External links

State libraries of the United States